Charisma candida is a species of extremely small sea snail, a marine gastropod mollusk in the family Trochidae, the top snails.

Description

Distribution
This marine species occurs off Japan.

References

 Higo, S., Callomon, P. & Goto, Y. (1999) Catalogue and Bibliography of the Marine Shell-Bearing Mollusca of Japan. Elle Scientific Publications, Yao, Japan, 749 pp.

External links
 World Register of Marine Species

candida
Gastropods described in 1861